The Gering Formation is a geologic group in Nebraska. It preserves fossils dating back to the Paleogene period. The formation is made of layers of very fine-grained, volcaniclastic sandstone and thin, horizontally stratified pale-to-gray brown sandstone, as well as sand crystals and ash beds.

See also

 List of fossiliferous stratigraphic units in Nebraska
 Paleontology in Nebraska

References

Paleogene geology of Nebraska
Paleogene geology of Wyoming